Ilija Petrović Strelja (d. 1825), also known as Ilija Delija (Илија Делија), was a Serbian revolutionary from Gradište, Leskovac. He collected many volunteers from his home region and went to northern Serbia. He was especially acclaimed for his efforts in the Battle of Deligrad (1806). He is enumerated in Serbian epic poetry.

See also
 List of Serbian Revolutionaries

References

Sources

Further reading
Сергије Димитријевић, Стреља – Лесковчани и Првом српском устанку (историја и предање), Лесковац, 1954.
Иван Ивановић,Војвода од Лесковца, Матица српска, Нови Сад, 1994.
Драгиша Костић, Поменик, 130 година од ослобођења Лесковца и 200 година борбе код Дедобарског хана, Народни музеј, Лесковац, 2007.
Саша З. Станковић, Илија Стреља Петровић у народној и ауторској књижевности , Власотиначки зборник 3, Народна библиотека Десанка Максимовић, Власотинце, 2009.

19th-century Serbian people
People of the First Serbian Uprising
People from Leskovac
Serbs from the Ottoman Empire
18th-century births
1825 deaths